The 2022 Stanford Cardinal men's volleyball team represented Stanford University in the 2022 NCAA Division I & II men's volleyball season. The Cardinal, led by sixteenth year head coach John Kosty, played their home games split between Burnham Pavilion & Ford Center and Maples Pavilion. After being told that the 2021 season would be the Cardinal's final season of men's volleyball play, the program was saved when the university reversed their decision near the end of last years athletic calendar. The Cardinal are members of the MPSF and were picked to finish sixth in the MPSF preseason poll. Stanford finished fifth and pulled off two upsets in the MPSF Volleyball Tournament before falling to Pepperdine in the Championship.

Season highlights
Will be filled in as the season progresses.

Roster

Schedule
TV/Internet Streaming information:
All home games will be televised on Pac-12 Network or streamed on Pac-12+ Stanford's streaming page. Most road games will also be streamed by the schools streaming service. The conference tournament will be streamed by FloVolleyball.

 *-Indicates conference match.
 Times listed are Pacific Time Zone.

Announcers for televised games

Lindenwood: Tim Swartz 
Lindenwood: Tim Swartz & Jordan Watkins
UC Irvine: Tim Swartz 
UC Irvine: Rob Espero & Charlie Brande
UC San Diego: Bryan Fenley & Ricci Luyties
Vanguard: Tim Swartz & Troy Clardy
UC Santa Cruz: Tim Swartz & Troy Clardy
Fairleigh Dickinson: Kanoa Leahey & Bill Walton
Hawai'i: Kanoa Leahey & Bill Walton
Menlo: Troy Clardy & Ted Enberg
CSUN: Troy Clardy
Long Beach State: Matt Brown & Matt Prosser
CSUN: Darren Preston 
Concordia Irvine: Patience O'Neal
Concordia Irvine: Patience O'Neal
UCLA: Tim Swartz & Ted Enberg
UCLA: Ted Enberg
USC: Ted Enberg 
USC: Ted Enberg 
Grand Canyon: Diana Johnson & Houston Boe
Grand Canyon: Diana Johnson & Houston Boe
BYU: Ted Enberg
BYU: Ted Enberg
Pepperdine: Al Epstein
Pepperdine: Al Epstein
MPSF Quarterfinal- Grand Canyon: Nick Koop
MPSF Semifinal- UCLA: Darren Preston
MPSF Championship- Pepperdine: Darren Preston

Rankings 

^The Media did not release a Pre-season poll.

References

2022 in sports in California
2022 NCAA Division I & II men's volleyball season
Stanford